Ralph Stefan Solecki (October 15, 1917 – March 20, 2019) was an American archaeologist. Solecki was born in Brooklyn, New York in October 1917, the son of Polish immigrants – Mary (nee Tarnowska), a homemaker, and Casimir, an insurance salesman. From 1959 to 1988, he was a member of the faculty at Columbia University. His best-known excavations were at the Neanderthal site at Shanidar Cave, in Iraq. His publications include early works on aerial photography and photo-interpretation as well as two volumes on Shanidar (1971, 1972). 

He was married to fellow archaeologist Rose Solecki, and they were the parents of American geographer William Solecki and UNHCR official John Solecki. In 2013, he was interviewed about his work by The Wall Street Journal. He died in March 2019, at the age of 101.

See also 
 List of fossil sites (with link directory)
 List of hominina (hominid) fossils (with images)

References

External links
Matthew R. Goodrum: "Ralph Solecki." In: Biographical Dictionary of the History of Paleoanthropology. Edited by Matthew R. Goodrum. (2020) Available at: https://drive.google.com/file/d/1uR944nQWfZrH_2vL0yjwoqUs5MI6sifU/view
Ralph Stefan Solecki (b. 1917)

1917 births
2019 deaths
American archaeologists
American centenarians
American expatriates in Iraq
American people of Polish descent
Columbia University faculty
Men centenarians